What Is to Be Done? Burning Questions of Our Movement is a political pamphlet written by Russian revolutionary Vladimir Lenin (credited as N. Lenin) in 1901 and published in 1902. Lenin said that the article represented "a skeleton plan to be developed in greater detail in a pamphlet now in preparation for print." Its title is taken from the 1863 novel of the same name by the Russian revolutionary Nikolai Chernyshevsky.

In What Is to Be Done?, Lenin argues that the working class will not spontaneously become political simply by fighting economic battles with employers over wages, working hours, and the like. To educate the working class on Marxism, Lenin insists that Marxists should form a political party, or vanguard, of dedicated revolutionaries in order to spread Marxist political ideas among the workers. The pamphlet, in part, precipitated the split of the Russian Social Democratic Labor Party between Lenin's Bolsheviks and the Mensheviks.

Main points 

Lenin first confronts the so-called economist trend in Russian social democracy that followed the line of Eduard Bernstein. He explains that Bernstein's positions were opportunist, a point expressed by the French socialist Alexandre Millerand as in taking a post in a bourgeois government. Against the economists' demand for freedom of criticism, Lenin advances the position that the orthodox Marxists had the same right to criticize in return. He stresses that in the struggle against the bourgeoisie, revolutionary social democrats would need to pay particular attention to theoretical questions, recalling Friedrich Engels' position that there were three forms of social democratic struggle, namely political, economic and theoretical.

Lenin hypothesizes that workers will not spontaneously become Marxists merely by fighting battles over wages with their employers. Instead, Marxists need to form a political party to publicize Marxist ideas and persuade workers to join. He argues that understanding politics requires understanding all of society, not just workers and their economic struggles with their employers. Class political consciousness can be brought to the workers only from without; that is, only from outside the economic struggle, from outside the sphere of relations between workers and employers. The sphere from which alone it is possible to obtain this knowledge is the sphere of relationships (of all classes and strata) to the state and the government, the sphere of the interrelations between all classes.

Reflecting on the wave of strikes in late 19th century Russia, Lenin writes that "the history of all countries shows that the working class, exclusively by its own efforts, is able to develop only trade-union consciousness"; that is, combining into trade unions and so on. However, socialist theory in Russia, as elsewhere in Europe, was the product of the "educated representatives of the propertied classes", the intellectuals or "revolutionary socialist intellectuals". Lenin states that Karl Marx and Engels themselves, the very founders of modern scientific socialism, belonged to this bourgeois intelligentsia.

Notes

References

Primary source 
 
 
 Lenin, Vladimir. 1901. What Is to Be Done?, translated J. Fineberg and G. Hanna. Lenin Internet Archive. Marxists Internet Archive. Retrieved 5 July 2020. Available as eText.

Further reading 
 T. Lih, Lars. 2006. Lenin Rediscovered: What Is to Be Done? in Context (Historical Materialism series). Leiden: Brill. Reviewed by:
 Blackledge, Paul. 3 July 2006. "What was Done". International Socialism 111. Retrieved 5 July 2020.
 Craig, Joe. 10 November 2006. "Review – 'Lenin Rediscovered: What Is to Be Done? in Context'. Socialist Democracy. Retrieved 5 July 2020.
 Sewell, Rob. 14 June 2018. "The Revolutionary Lessons of Lenin's What Is to Be Done?". In Defense of Marxism. International Marxist Tendency. Retrieved 13 May 2019.
 "What They Did to What Is to Be Done?, Hal Draper's essay contextualizing WITBD

External links
 

1902 non-fiction books
Communist books
Pamphlets
Russian Social Democratic Labour Party
Works by Vladimir Lenin